Labra is one of eleven parishes (administrative divisions)  in Cangas de Onís, a municipality within the province and autonomous community of Asturias, by northern Spain's Picos de Europa mountains.

Villages
 Cebia
 Llabra
 Tresanu

References

Parishes in Cangas de Onis